Bojan Tadić (born February 16, 1972) is a Serbian former professional basketball player.

International career 
Tadić was a member of the SFR Yugoslavia national cadet team that won the silver medal at the 1989 European Championship for Cadets in Spain. Over seven tournament games, he averaged 9.8 points per game.

References

External links
 
 

1972 births
Living people
KK Crvena zvezda players
KK Metalac Valjevo players
KK MZT Skopje players
KK Spartak Subotica players
Serbian men's basketball players
Serbian expatriate basketball people in Bosnia and Herzegovina
Serbian expatriate basketball people in Slovenia
Serbian expatriate basketball people in France
Serbian expatriate basketball people in Israel
Serbian expatriate basketball people in Switzerland
Serbian expatriate basketball people in Turkey
Serbian expatriate basketball people in North Macedonia
Sportspeople from Kragujevac
Power forwards (basketball)